Radio Tomislavgrad is a Bosnian and Herzegovinian local public radio station, broadcasting from Tomislavgrad, Bosnia and Herzegovina.

Estimated number of potential listeners is around 68,409.

Radio Tomislavgrad was launched during Bosnian War on 18 May 1992 as local/municipal service. Program is mainly produced in Croatian. This radio station broadcasts a variety of programs such as music, local news and talk shows. Due to the favorable geographical position in West Herzegovina and Duvanjsko Polje region, this radiostation is also available in neighboring Croatia.

Frequencies
The program is currently broadcast on 5 frequencies:

 Tomislavgrad 
 Tomislavgrad  
 Olovo - Kupres  
 Livno 
 Bosansko Grahovo

See also 
List of radio stations in Bosnia and Herzegovina

References

External links 
 www.radiotg.com
 Communications Regulatory Agency of Bosnia and Herzegovina

Tomislavgrad
Radio stations established in 1992